A masonry oven, colloquially known as a brick oven or stone oven, is an oven consisting of a baking chamber made of fireproof brick, concrete, stone, clay (clay oven), or cob (cob oven). Though traditionally wood-fired, coal-fired ovens were common in the 19th century, and modern masonry ovens are often fired with natural gas or even electricity. Modern masonry ovens are closely associated with artisan bread and pizza, but in the past they were used for any cooking task involving baking. Masonry ovens are built by masons.

Origins and history
Humans built masonry ovens long before they started writing. The process began as soon as our ancestors started using fire to cook their food, probably by spit-roasting over live flame or coals. Big starchy roots and other slower-cooking foods, however, cooked better when they were buried in hot ashes, and sometimes covered with hot stones, and/or more hot ash. Large quantities might be cooked in an earth oven: a hole in the ground, pre-heated with a large fire, and further warmed by the addition of hot rocks.

Many such practices continue today, as well as showing up in the archeological record, but masonry ovens like the ones we know now only appear with the start of grain agriculture — in other words, bread (and beer — which is the likely source of the yeast used to make the first bread rise). Ancient Egyptians left drawings of bakers putting dough on a hot rock and covering it with a hot clay pot — the first "true" oven. Over time, the single-loaf ovens grew large enough to bake multiple loaves, and construction practices expanded from holes in the ground to clay pots to brick and rock domes and vaults.

Masonry ovens are used by Arabs in Arab States of the Persian Gulf for the preparation of the traditional khubz bread.

In India and Pakistan, tandoors are traditional clay ovens, although these days modern electrically fired tandoors are available. The open-topped tandoor is a transitional design between the earth oven and the Roman-plan masonry oven. In the precolumbian Americas, similar ovens were often made of clay or adobe and are now referred to by the Spanish term horno (meaning "oven"). Hornos are also traditional in the American Southwest.

The traditional direct-fired masonry design is often called a "Roman" or "black" oven and dates in Western culture to at least the Roman Republic. It is known as a black oven because the fire generates soot on the roof of the oven. Black ovens were often built to serve entire communities (compare the banal ovens of France, which were often owned by the local government and whose operators charged a fee to oven users). Such ovens became popular in the Americas during the colonial era. They are widely used in artisanal bakeries and pizzerias, restaurants featuring pizzas and baked dishes, and increasingly as small backyard or home ovens.

So-called "white ovens" are a later development, and are heated from the outside of the masonry such that flame and soot never touch the inner oven walls—they are more common as accessory features of a masonry heater. A compromise design known as the gueulard in France combines aspects of both internal and external-fired models.

Efficiency and use 

Masonry ovens remain popular in part because of the way their use affects cooking processes and food flavor. Where modern gas or electric ovens cook food by moving hot air around inside an insulated, lightweight box, a masonry oven works by soaking up heat, like a battery building up a full charge. When hot, the heavy oven walls release the heat slowly, for hours. Thus the food is cooked not only by hot air but also by radiant heat from hot dense masonry and especially for bread and pizza, which are not cooked in pans, heat conducted directly into the food from hot floor bricks (bakers call the resulting added rising action of bread "oven spring".) Finally, a masonry oven seals in the steam produced by the water in cooking food. A supercharged steamy atmosphere produces a more flavorful and chewy crust (see Maillard reaction); it also keeps other foods moist and tender. The triple combination of radiant, conductive, and convected heat also speeds cooking.

Wood-burning masonry ovens are mandated for production of true Neapolitan pizza.

Construction 

In the same way that masonry oven cooking techniques have not changed much over the millennia, neither have construction practices. Whether built with mud, brick, or modern refractories, any oven is basically a masonry shell, a smaller version of structures such as the Roman Pantheon, Filippo Brunelleschi's dome in Florence, or Houston's Astrodome. Early ovens were simply clay soil (usually tempered with sand to reduce cracking, as in brick-making) built up over a form of sticks or sand. When the clay was stiff enough to cut open a doorway, the sand was dug out, or the wood was burned out. Smoke is vented out the oven door, either directly to the outside or through a chimney immediately above the oven door.

Brick ovens can also be built over formwork, though many cultures developed dome-building methods that required no forms, such as traditional Italian dome ovens. These are laid up free-form, sometimes only by eye. The first course is a circle of brick or half-bricks; the next course is laid on a wedge-shaped mortar bed. Each succeeding circle of brick sits at a steeper pitch and draws the dome closer to the center. Suction between dry bricks and wet mortar holds bricks in place until the courses approach vertical, at which point the mason may use a stick as additional support until the top of the dome is closed with the central keystone. Square or rectangular ovens can be built with standard bricks and little cutting. Specially tapered arch bricks make for easier and stronger vaults, but without buttressing or a steel harness, the weight of the vault pushes out on the walls and can cause collapse. Round ovens require more cutting, but generally need less buttressing. Whether the materials are mud and brick, the latest high temperature castables, or pre-fabricated modular ovens, all these methods are still in use. In all cases, the ovens typically go under a roof or some kind of weather protection.

Modern insulation practices
Perhaps the most significant change in masonry oven construction practices is insulation. Since masonry loses heat as fast as (or faster than) it absorbs it, early ovens extended bake times by increasing mass. Thicker walls held more heat to bake more bread — but only up to a point. Since heat moves from high to lower temperature, the outside of the oven cannot get as hot as the inside — unless it is wrapped in a fireproof blanket. Like a person in a bed, an oven needs a mattress underneath, as well as a blanket over top, but where a person may weigh a couple of hundred pounds, an oven may weigh thousands. Nature offers few materials that combine compressive strength, insulative properties, and imperviousness to high temperatures, but recent technology has greatly expanded the options.

Thermodynamics of insulating masonry ovens
Some masonry oven designs slow heat loss by raising the oven up off (or out of) the damp ground. Traditional Canadian clay ovens were even built on wood frames, which is possible when the masonry is thick enough to prevent the wood from getting too hot (over-firing can be dangerous). Other insulative plinth material might include lightweight stone like tufa or pumice. In the 1980s, Alan Scott, called by some the grandfather of modern wood-fired ovens, popularized a practice of building ovens on a lightweight slab of concrete made with lightweight aggregate such as pumice, perlite, or vermiculite. He further reduced heat loss by extending the rebar through the formwork onto the tops of the side walls, effectively “hanging” the slab (and oven) on the supporting walls. Removing the form left about an inch of air gap to isolate the entire oven structure from the base. That isolation effectively broke the thermal “bridge” that otherwise allowed heat from the oven to leak into the base.

Other methods achieve similar results. Commercially available, high-strength insulative board makes a good, firm, warm “oven mattress” that conveniently solves the problem of weight bearing insulation and provides an easy way to break contact with surrounding cold. Some earthen oven builders use a lo-cost combination of empty glass bottles surrounded by an insulative mix of clay and fine organic matter (sawdust, chaff, nut shells, etc.); as the organics burn out, they leave thousands of tiny voids in the clay, making a spongey, insulative, and firm foam-like material.

To keep the top of the oven warm, masons may build walls around the oven, crib-like, to make space for a loose cover of perlite, pumice, or vermiculite. For a smaller profile and a rounder look, the oven may be wrapped in mineral wool blankets (similar to fiberglass but made from clay or rock and much more resistant to high temperatures and thermal cycling). Mineral wool blankets do need to be covered — either with a reinforced stucco shell, tile, or equivalent.

Based on a survey of Canadian clay ovens, Boily and Blanchette suggest an ideal relationship between door and dome height of 63% -- a higher dome will reduce radiant heat, while a high door will allow heat to escape; if the door is less than 63% of dome height, air and smoke can't circulate freely and the fire won't burn well.

Modern masonry ovens sometimes bear little resemblance to their forebears, and can have just a cast deck (similar to a pizza stone) inside a more conventional oven exterior. Such devices are primarily used in commercial settings, though tabletop models are available.

Types

Cob, clay, and earthen ovens
Cob is the British name for what is essentially adobe (from Arabic, "al toba," meaning "the mud;" "cob" is the Anglo-Saxon word for "lump," and is also used to describe round loaves of bread, or small, compact horses). As the most common building material on the planet, earth, clay and "cob" construction have become increasingly popular among people interested in simpler, less environmentally destructive materials and methods. Wood-fired ovens make popular starter projects, which has generated a large number of "cob oven" projects, many of them documented on the web.

However, early masonry ovens going all the way back to ancient Egypt were typically made of native clay, often tempered (to minimize cracking) with gravel, sand, and/or straw. Smaller ovens were built over forms made of sand, or a rough, basket-like shell made of sticks. After the form was covered, the sand was shoveled out, or the sticks burnt. Clome ovens were a modular (and sometimes portable) variant—essentially a large, upside-down clay pot with a door opening cut into the side. They were often surrounded with brick as they were built into English chimneys, allowing coals and ashes to be swept onto the common hearth, and smoke to go into the chimney. "Like the Athenian cooking bell and the primitive quern, the rough clay oven had its counterparts for several thousand years, among its descendants being our own seventeenth-century Devon gravel-tempered clay wall ovens.... Built into the side wall of the open hearth so that from the front only the opening was visible, these primitive-looking ovens were still being produced in Barnstaple potteries as late as 1890".

Ceramic cloche
A cloche or cooking bell is like an upside-down, fired ceramic bowl with a handle on top. It is heated in the fire along with a flat rock or open spot on the hearth. The prepared dough is placed on the hot rock or hearth floor, and then covered with the cloche, and perhaps hot coals or ashes for additional heat. The method goes back to ancient Egypt and Greece, and was probably the first form of masonry oven.

Simulation
It is possible to get some of the benefits of a masonry oven without constructing a full oven. The most common method is the stoneware pizza stone, which stores heat while the oven is preheating and transmits it directly to the bottom of the pizza. Common firebricks can be used in a similar manner to cover a shelf. Bread and meat can be cooked in a type of covered ceramic casserole dish known variously as a cloche, a Schlemmertopf (brand name), or the like. Good results can also be had by cooking the bread in a pre-heated Dutch oven with a well-fitting lid. Most expensive is a ceramic or stoneware oven liner that provides many of the benefits of a cloche without restricting the baker to one size of pan.

It is sometimes possible to cook bread on a grill to simulate the use of radiant heat in a masonry oven; while this is generally reserved for flatbreads and pizzas, a few recipes for loaf breads are designed to use a grill as well, with or without a masonry or ceramic heating surface.

See also
 Chimenea
 Dutch oven
 Outdoor cooking
 Primitive clay oven
 Wood-fired oven

References

External links
 Masonry Heater Association Bake Oven page: resource page for wood-fired ovens
 West Hartford Brick Oven: Wood fired oven construction over 4 months
 Build a bread oven: Details about 2 constructions: a clay oven and a tiles oven
 Outdoor pizza oven: Guide about construction of outdoor brick ovens
 Reference from Patent D642,855

Ovens
Masonry buildings and structures
Baking
Barbecue
Fireplaces
Firing techniques